Ugnė  is a female given name currently popular in Lithuania, where it was the third most popular name given to baby girls in 2010. It means "fire" in Lithuanian.

Person named Ugnė
Ugnė Karvelis (1935–2002), Lithuanian  writer, a translator and a member of the UNESCO Executive Board 
Ugnė Mažutaitytė (born 1997), Lithuanian swimmer
Ugnė Johnson (born 1912), the world's oldest Ugnė

References

Lithuanian feminine given names
Feminine given names